This is a list of current high definition channels that are available in the United Kingdom, together with those coming in the future, and those that have ceased broadcasting.

All HD channels in the UK broadcast at 1080i, apart from Sky Sports Main Event UHD channel and the BT Sport Ultimate 4K.

 HD channels can dynamically switch between 1080i/25 and 1080p/25 when broadcast via Freeview HD.

HD channels

Notes

References

External links
Freesat – Channels
Freeview – Channels
Sky – Box Sets
Virgin Media – What can I watch in HD?

HD channels in the UK
HD UK
HD channels
UK channels